Angeies railway station (also Αγγείες or Αγγείαι) is a railway station situated near the village of Makryrrachi in Phthiotis, Greece. The station was opened on 8 March 1904.. It was served by intercity trains between Athens and Thessaloniki. In June 2018, it was closed and replaced by a new station directly opposite on the new Athens-Thessaloniki high-speed line. It is served by trains between Athens and Kalampaka.

References

Railway stations in Central Greece
Railway stations opened in 1904
Buildings and structures in Phthiotis